Nadir Nabiyev (born on 18 July 1980 in Tovuz, Azerbaijan) is a retired Azerbaijani football player who played striker for the Azerbaijan national team and who last played for Azerbaijan Premier League club Turan Tovuz.

Playing career

Club

International
Nabiyev earned 27 caps for Azerbaijan over the four-year he played for the national team, scoring 3 times. His debut came in July 2002 in a friendly against Estonia. His first two goals for Azerbaijan came on 14 December 2003 against the United Arab Emirates.

Career statistics

Club

International

International goals

Honours

Club
Neftchi Baku
 Azerbaijan Premier League: 2003–04.
 Azerbaijan Cup: 2001–02
CIS Cup: 2006

Khazar Lankaran
2007–08

References

External links 

1980 births
Living people
Azerbaijani footballers
Azerbaijan international footballers
Association football forwards
Turan-Tovuz IK players
People from Tovuz
Khazar Lankaran FK players
Neftçi PFK players